Yttrium(III) nitrate is an inorganic compound, a salt with the formula Y(NO3)3. The hexahydrate is the most common form commercially available.

Preparation
Yttrium(III) nitrate can be prepared by dissolving corresponding metal oxide in 6 mol/L nitric acid:

 Y2O3 + 6 HNO3 → 2 Y(NO3)3 + 3 H2O

Properties
Yttrium(III) nitrate hexahydrate loses crystallized water at relatively low temperature. Upon further heating, basic salt YONO3 is formed. At 600 C, the thermal decomposition is complete. Y2O3 is the final product.

Y(NO3)3·3TBP is formed when tributyl phosphate is used as the extracting solvent.

Uses
Yttrium(III) nitrate is mainly used as a source of Y3+ cations. It is a precursor of some yttrium-containing materials, such as Y4Al2O9, YBa2Cu3O6.5+x and yttrium-based metal-organic frameworks.
 It can also be used as a catalyst in organic synthesis.

References

Yttrium compounds
Nitrates